Antonio Roberts (also known as hellocatfood), is a new media artist and curator based in Birmingham UK, notable for his work in the areas of glitch art, installation art and live coding performance, including live visuals and/or music performances at algoraves. His work often addresses themes around open source software, free culture and copyright.

He was awarded a BOM Fellowship in 2016, a Near Now Fellowship in 2017, and July 2019 was announced as one of 15 artists appointed to a-n The Artists Information Company's 'Artists Council'.

References

External links 

Official homepage

Software bugs
Algorave
New media artists
Live coding
Living people
Year of birth missing (living people)